In the United States armed forces, the Chiefs of Chaplains of the United States are the senior service chaplains who lead and represent the Chaplain Corps of the United States Army, Navy, and Air Force. The Navy created the first Office of the Chief of Chaplains in 1917; the Army followed in 1920, and the Air Force established its own in 1948 after it became a separate branch.

The three Chiefs of Chaplains and the three active-duty Deputy Chiefs of Chaplains from the Army, Navy, and Air Force comprise the Armed Forces Chaplains Board (AFCB) which advises the Secretary of Defense and the Under Secretary of Defense for Personnel and Readiness on religious, ethical, and moral matters, in addition to a number of policy issues.

The current military Chiefs of Chaplains are:

Chaplains of the Marine Corps and Coast Guard
As the Marine Corps and Coast Guard do not commission chaplains, the United States Navy Deputy Chief of Chaplains also serves as Chaplain of the United States Marine Corps, and a senior Navy Chaplain holding the rank of Navy Captain serves as Chaplain of the Coast Guard. A former Air Force Chief of Chaplains serves as Chaplain for the United States Space Force. The current chaplains are:

See also
International Military Chiefs of Chaplains Conference
Chaplain General
Armed Forces Chaplaincy Center
Religious symbolism in the United States military

References

United States
American military officers
United States